Maari is an Indian Tamil-language Supernatural television series airing on Zee Tamil and streaming on digital platform ZEE5 from 4 July 2022. It starring Ashika Padukone and Adarsh in the lead roles. The series is an official remake of Zee Bangla series Trinayani, where Ashika reprising her role in its Telugu remake with same title.

Plot
Maari, a simple small town girl, experiences the boon and bane of her power of premonition. She goes on to marry Surya under unusual circumstances and turns out to be his saviour.

Cast

Main
 Ashika Padukone as Maari (a predictor and fortune teller woman, who ready to save Suriya's life by marrying him) 
 Adarsh HS as Suriya (a rich entrepreneur, Maari's husband, His life was in danger by Thara's evil plans)

Supporting
 Sona Heiden as Thara (Surya's step mother, Aravind, Dinesh and Priya's mother, Jagadeesh's second wife) (Main Antagonist)
 Shiva Subramanian as Jagadeesh (Devi's first husband, Thara's second husband, Surya's father) 
 Abitha as Deivanai (Maari adoptive mother, Sreeja's mother) 
 Delhi Ganesh as Neelakandan (Maari and Sreeja's grandfather, Deivanai's father)
 Saira Banu as Sreeja (Maari's sister, Dinesh's wife, Thara's second daughter-in-law)(Antagonist)
 Shabnam as Hasini (Aravind's wife, Thara's daughter-in-law)
 Shyam as Vikram (Hasini’s brother)
 Meera Krishna as Devi (a spirit, Suriya's mother, Jagadeesh's first wife) 
 Mukesh Kanna as Aravind (Thara's first son, Hasini's husband) 
 Tharun Appasamy as Dinesh (Thara's second son, Sreeja's husband)  
 Nisha Yazhini as Priya (Thara's daughter)
 Ganesh as Sankarapandi (Thara's brother)
 Anitha Venkat as Sujatha (Devi's sister)
 Deepa Nethran as Parvathi (Jagadeesh's sister, Maari’s biological mother)

Special Appearances
 Vanitha Vijayakumar as Sagunthala (Suriya's relation)
 Pandiarajan as Vinayagam (Sagunthala's husband)
 Krishnapriya K Nair as Meena (Maari's friend, Vinayagam and Sagunthala's daughter)
 Nimesh Sagar as Kishore (Meena's husband)
 Sudha Chandran as Chamundeshwari (Jagadeesh's elder sister)
 Vinodini as Janaki (Devi's friend, deceased)
 Keerthana as Amman

Production

Development
Zee Bangla's popular fiction Trinayani was remade on Zee Telugu on 2019 with the same title name as Trinayani, it got the huge responses and reception from Telugu audience. So Zee Tamil channel decided to remake it in Tamil under the title Maari.

Ashika Padukone was signed to portray the lead role Maari, also she was portraying the lead role in titular character in Telugu's Trinayani. Kannada actor Adarsh was selected to play the role Surya by making his Tamil debut. Actress Abitha was joined the cast and making her presence in the television after three years. She was well known for her performance in the TV series Thirumathi Selvam as Archana . Veteran actor Delhi Ganesh plays a grandfather role of Maari, where actress Sona Heiden was selected to play the negative lead and Meera Krishna was portraying as a spirit while familiar face Vanitha Vijayakumar and actor Pandiarajan were in prominent roles.

Promotion
Zee Tamil was promoted their new three fictions Amudhavum Annalakshmiyum, Meenakshi Ponnunga and including this series by making advertisement with popular film actress Sneha, Saranya Ponvannan and Sangeetha with the slogan Vanga Paarkalaam Ithu Namma Time and this promo released on 26 June 2022.

The Channel also arranged the press meet with the cast of the three fictions at Vadapalani, Chennai.

Release
The first promo was released on 8 June 2022 by giving the series hint. On 23 June 2022, the second promo was unveiled, featuring the cast, synopsis of the series with the release date and time.

Within few weeks of launch, it became the No.1 Serial in Channel.

Awards:

Maari bags Best Villi, Best Serial, People's Choice face of the Year (Female) awards in Zee Kudumba Virudhugal 2022.

Adaptations

References

External links
 
 Maari at ZEE5

Zee Tamil original programming
Tamil-language television soap operas
Tamil-language fantasy television series
Tamil-language romance television series
Tamil-language mystery television series
2022 Tamil-language television series debuts
Television shows set in Tamil Nadu
Tamil-language television shows
Tamil-language television series based on Bengali-languages television series